This article contains the discography of the American jazz trumpeter and singer Chet Baker. His most productive period was arguably for Pacific Records during the 1950s, which included his first vocal recordings.

Discography

Pacific Jazz/World Pacific 
 1953: This Time the Dream's on Me: Chet Baker Quartet Live, Vol. 1 (2000)
 1953: The Chet Baker Quartet (1953) with Russ Freeman
 1953: Chet Baker Quartet featuring Russ Freeman (1953)
 1953: Chet Baker Ensemble (1953)
 1953-54: West Coast Live (1997) with Stan Getz
 1954: Out of Nowhere: Chet Baker Quartet Live, Vol. 2 (2001)
 1954: My Old Flame: Chet Baker Quartet Live, Vol. 3 (2001)
 1954: Chet Baker Sings (1954) 
 1954: Chet Baker Sextet (1954)
 1953-54: The Trumpet Artistry of Chet Baker (1955)
 1954: Jazz at Ann Arbor (1954)
 1953-55: Grey December (1992)
 1955: Chet Baker Sings and Plays (1955) with Bud Shank, Russ Freeman And Strings
 1955: Chet Baker in Europe (1955) - this album is sub-titled A Jazz Tour of the NATO Countries
 1956: Chet Baker & Crew (1957)
 1956: The Route (1989) with Art Pepper
 1956: Chet Baker Big Band (1956)
 1956: Playboys (1956) with Art Pepper – also released as Picture of Heath
 1956: Quartet: Russ Freeman/Chet Baker (1957)
 1953-57: Pretty/Groovy (World Pacific, 1958)
 1957: Embraceable You (1995)

 1965: A Taste of Tequila (World Pacific, 1966) with The Mariachi Brass
 1966: Hats Off (World Pacific, 1966) with The Mariachi Brass
 1966: Quietly There (World Pacific, 1966) with the Carmel Strings
 1966: Double-Shot (World Pacific, 1966) with The Mariachi Brass
 1966: Into My Life (World Pacific, 1966) with the Carmel Strings
 1966: In The Mood (World Pacific, 1966) with The Mariachi Brass

Barclay/EmArcy 
 Chet Baker Quartet (1955) – also known as Rondette
 Chet Baker Quartet (1955) – also known as Summertime
 Chet Baker and His Quintet with Bobby Jaspar (1956) – also known as Alone Together
 Chet in Paris, Vol. 1: Featuring Dick Twardzik (EmArcy, 1988) – recorded in 1955
 Chet in Paris, Vol. 2: Everything Happens to Me (EmArcy, 1988) – recorded in 1955
 Chet in Paris, Vol. 3: Cheryl (EmArcy, 1988) – recorded in 1955–56
 Chet in Paris, Vol. 4: Alternate Takes (EmArcy, 1988) – recorded in 1955–56. this series has been sub-titled...The Complete Barclay Recordings of Chet Baker.

Riverside/Jazzland 
 (Chet Baker Sings) It Could Happen to You (1958) 
 Chet Baker in New York (1958) – also released as Polka Dots and Moonbeams
 Chet Baker Introduces Johnny Pace with Johnny Pace (1958)
 Chet (1959) – this album is sub-titled The Lyrical Trumpet of Chet Baker
 Chet Baker Plays the Best of Lerner and Loewe (1959)
 Chet Baker in Milan (Jazzland, 1959)
 Chet Baker with Fifty Italian Strings (Jazzland, 1959) – also released as Angel Eyes

Prestige
 Smokin' with the Chet Baker Quintet (1965)
 Groovin' with the Chet Baker Quintet (1965)
 Comin' On with the Chet Baker Quintet (1965)
 Cool Burnin' with the Chet Baker Quintet (1965)
 Boppin' with the Chet Baker Quintet (1965)

SteepleChase
 The Touch of Your Lips (1979) - with Doug Raney, Niels-Henning Ørsted Pedersen
 No Problem (1979) - with Duke Jordan
 Daybreak (1979) - with Doug Raney, Niels-Henning Ørsted Pedersen
 This Is Always (1979 [1982]) - with Doug Raney, Niels-Henning Ørsted Pedersen
 Someday My Prince Will Come (1979 [1983]) - with Doug Raney, Niels-Henning Ørsted Pedersen
 Diane (1985) - with Paul Bley
 When Sunny Gets Blue (1986)

Enja
 Oh You Crazy Moon (1978 [2003]) 
 Peace (1982) 
 Strollin' (1986) - with Philip Catherine, Jean-Louis Rassinfosse
 My Favourite Songs: The Last Great Concert (1988) 
 Straight from the Heart: The Great Last Concert, Vol. 2 (1990) 
 The Last Great Concert: My Favourite Songs, Vols. 1 & 2 (1988)

Circle
 Night Bird (1980)
 Tune Up (1980 [1981])
 My Funny Valentine (1980 [1981])	
 Round Midnight (1980 [1982])
 In Your Own Sweet Way (1980 [1983])
 Just Friends: Chet Baker Live in the Subway Club (1980 [1984])
 I Remember You (1980 [1984])
 Conception (1980 [1985]) - with Karl Ratzer
 Down: Chet Baker Live in the Subway Club (1980 [1988])
 It Never Entered My Mind (1980 [1990])

Timeless
 Everything Happens To Me (1983) - with Kirk Lightsey Trio
 Mr. B (1983)
 Chet Baker Sings Again (1985)
 There'll Never Be Another You (1985 [1997]) - with Philip Catherine
 As Time Goes By (1986) - note: this album is sub-titled Love Songs
 Cool Cat (1986 [1989]) - note: this album is sub-titled Chet Baker Plays, Chet Baker Sings 
 Farewell (1988)
 Live in Rosenheim (1988)
 Heartbreak: Chet Baker With Strings (1991)

Fresh Sound
 Inglewood Jam: Bird & Chet Live at the Trade Winds (1952) - with Charlie Parker
 Chet Baker Live at the Trade Winds (1952) - with Sonny Criss, Wardell Gray, Jack Montrose, Al Haig
 L.A. Get-Together! (1952–1953) - with Stan Getz
 At the Forum Theater (1956) - with Phil Urso, Bobby Timmons
 Burnin' at Backstreet (1980)
 Live at Fat Tuesday's (1981) - with Bud Shank

Philology
 Haig '53: The Other Piano Less Quartet (1953 [1996]) - with Stan Getz
 In Europe, 1955 (1955 [1991])
 A Trumpet for the Sky: Club 21, Paris - Vols. 1 & 2 (1983 [1993])
 Live from the Moonlight (1985 [1988])
 A Night at the Shalimar Club (1987 [1991])
 Little Girl Blue (1988) - with the Space Jazz Trio

Other labels
 Chet Baker & Strings (Columbia, 1954)
 Stan Meets Chet  with Stan Getz (Verve Records, 1958)
 Chet Baker Quintet Cools Out (Crown, 1963)
 Chet Is Back! (RCA, 1962)
 The Most Important Jazz Album of 1964/65 (Colpix, 1964) 
 Baby Breeze (Limelight, 1965)
 Baker's Holiday (Limelight, 1965)
 Albert's House (Beverly Hills, 1969) 
 Blood, Chet and Tears (Verve, 1970)
 She Was Too Good to Me (CTI, 1974)
 The Incredible Chet Baker Plays and Sings (Carosello Records, 1977)
 You Can't Go Home Again (A&M/Horizon, 1977)
 Ballads for Two with Wolfgang Lackerschmid (Sandra Music, 1979)
 Rendez-Vous (Bingow, 1979)
 Once Upon a Summertime (Artists House, 1980)
 Live in Paris (Circle, 1980)
 Leaving (Intercord, 1980)
 Broken Wing (Inner City, 1981)
 In Concert (India Navigation, 1982)
 The Improviser (Cadence Jazz, 1984)
 At Capolinea (Red, 1984)
 Blues for a Reason (Criss Cross, 1984)
 Chet's Choice (Criss Cross, 1985)
 Hazy Hugs (Limetree, 1985)
 Witch Doctor (Contemporary, 1985)
 Chet Baker Plays Vladimir Cosma (Carrere, 1985)
 Candy (Sonet, 1985)
 Live at Nick's (Criss Cross, 1987)
 Memories: Chet Baker in Tokyo (Paddle Wheel, 1988)
 Stella by Starlight (West Wind, 1989)
 The Best Thing for You (A&M, 1989)
 Chet Baker Sings and Plays from the Film "Let's Get Lost" (Novus/RCA, 1989)
 Out of Nowhere (Milestone, 1991)
 Chet Baker and the Boto Brazilian Quartet (Dreyfus, 1991)
 Chet Baker in Bologna (Dreyfus, 1992)
 Live at Pueblo, Colorado 1966 (CCB, 1992)
 Chet Baker in Tokyo, Live with Harold Danko, Hein Van Der Geyn, John Engels (Evidence, 1996)
 Sings, Plays: Live at the Keystone Korner (HighNote, 2003)
 Live in London (Ubuntu, 2016)

 As sideman 

With Stan Getz
 Stan Meets Chet (Verve, 1958)
 Line for Lyons (Sonet, 1983)

With Jim Hall
 Concierto (CTI, 1975)
 Studio Trieste (CTI, 1982) also with Hubert Laws

With Gerry Mulligan
 Gerry Mulligan Quartet Volume 1 (Pacific Jazz, 1952)
 The Gerry Mulligan Quartet (Fantasy, 1953)
 Lee Konitz Plays with the Gerry Mulligan Quartet  (Pacific Jazz, 1953)
 Gerry Mulligan Quartet Volume 2 (Pacific Jazz, 1953)
 Gene Norman Presents 'The Gerry Mulligan Quartet' (GNP, 1954)
 Reunion with Chet Baker (World Pacific, 1958)
 Annie Ross Sings a Song with Mulligan! (World Pacific, 1959)
 Carnegie Hall Concert (CTI, 1974)

With Art Pepper
 The Artistry of Pepper (Pacific Jazz, 1962)
 Art Pepper Plays Shorty Rogers & Others (Pacific Jazz, 1978)

With Bud Shank
 Michelle (World Pacific, 1966)
 California Dreamin' (World Pacific, 1966)
 Brazil! Brazil! Brazil! (World Pacific, 1966)
 Magical Mystery (World Pacific, 1968)

With others
 Harry Babasin, On the Coast (Jazz Showcase, 1978)
 Ron Carter, Patrão (Milestone, 1981)
 Philip Catherine, Jean-Louis Rassinfosse, Crystal Bells (LDH, 1983)
 Elvis Costello, Punch the Clock (Columbia, 1983)
 Miles Davis, At Last (Contemporary, 1985)
 Lizzy Mercier Descloux, One for the Soul (Polydor, 1986) 
 Astrud Gilberto, That Girl from Ipanema (Image, 1977)
 Jean-Jacques Goldman, Non homologué (Epic, 1985)
 Rachel Gould, All Blues (Bingow 1979)
 Michel Graillier, Dream Drops (Owl, 1982)
 Lars Gullin, The Great Lars Gullin Vol. 1 '55/'56 (Dragon, 1982)
 Charlie Haden, Silence (Soul Note, 1989) – recorded in 1987
 Herbie Hancock, Round Midnight (Columbia, 1986)
 Roland Hanna, Gershwin Carmichael Cats (CTI, 1982)
 Wolfgang Lackerschmid, Chet Baker / Wolfgang Lackerschmid (Sandra Music Productions, 1979)
 Kirk Lightsey, Everything Happens to Me (Timeless, 1983)
 Joe Pass, A Sign of the Times (World Pacific, 1966)
 Jack Sheldon, Jack's Groove (GNP, 1961)
 Archie Shepp, In Memory Of (L+R, 1988)
 Dick Twardzik, The Last Set (Pacific Jazz, 1962)
 Jan Erik Vold, Blåmann! Blåmann!'' (Hot Club, 1988)

References

External links 
 Discogs
 Circle Records Germany

Discography
Discographies of American artists
Jazz discographies
Vocal jazz discographies